The Albanian Christian Democratic Party of Kosovo (PSHDK) is a political party in Kosovo. It embraces Christian-democratic ideals in Kosovo, although not all of its members are Catholic, as is the case in some other countries.
 
At the last legislative elections, 24 October 2004, the party won 1.8% of the popular vote and 2 out of 120 seats.

The president of Albanian Christian Democratic Party of Kosovo is Nikë Gjeloshi.

The Albanian Christian Democratic Party of Kosovo is a close ally of the Democratic League of Kosovo (LDK), consequently, the first post-war minister of transport and telecommunications of the Kosovo Government was a member of PShDK. The Albanian Christian Democratic Party of Kosovo platform supports Kosovo independence and like all other Kosovo Albanian political parties does not take part in the general elections in Serbia nor any other election or referendum organized by the Serbian parliament.

Election Results

See also
Simon Augustini, vice-chairman of PShDK.
 Albanian Union of Christian Democrats

References

External links
Partia Shqiptare Demokristiane e Kosovës The official website

Albanian nationalism in Kosovo
Albanian nationalist parties
Christian democratic parties in Europe
Conservative parties in Kosovo
Political parties in Kosovo
Political parties with year of establishment missing
Social conservative parties